Banu Bashyam is an Indian make-up artist working in Tamil cinema.

Life 
After doing a beautician course in Mumbai, Banu Bashyam left for the United States to learn make-up at an institute owned by the Broadway make-up artist Bob Kelly. She later returned to India and became a make-up artist for advertisements. She went on to work in numerous high-profile films including Sivaji: The Boss (2007), Vaaranam Aayiram (2008) and Enthiran (2010).

Awards 
Ananda Vikatan Cinema Awards
 2007: Best Makeup Artist – Sivaji: The Boss
 2008: Best Makeup Artist – Dasavathaaram
 2009: Best Makeup Artist – Ayan
 2010: Best Makeup Artist – Enthiran
 2011: Best Makeup Artist – 7aum Arivu
 2018: Best Makeup Artist – 2.0
 2019: Best Makeup Artist – Asuran

Vijay Awards
 2008: Best Makeup Artist – Vaaranam Aayiram
 2010: Best Makeup Artist – Enthiran

References

Indian make-up artists
Living people
Year of birth missing (living people)

External links